Lone Star Infrastructure (LSI) is a consortium of major highway construction contractors and civil engineering firms that was awarded a Comprehensive Development Agreement by the Texas Department of Transportation to design and build State Highway 130.

Member companies

 Fluor Daniel
 Balfour Beatty Construction, Inc.
 T.J. Lambrecht Construction, Inc.
 DMJM + HARRIS (a subsidiary of AECOM)
 Dr. Dan Zollinger
 S&B Infrastructure, Ltd.
 Southwest Strategies Group, Inc.
 SWG&M Advertising, Inc.
 Hicks & Company
 TBE Group, Inc.
 VMS, Inc.
 Austin Road & Bridge
 Raba Kistner Consultants, Inc.
 Jones Bros., Inc.
 Bridgefarmer & Associates, Inc.
 Macias & Associates, Inc.
 O.R. Colan Associates, Inc.
 Dr. Dallas Little, P.E.
 CTL/Thompson, Inc.

Environmental considerations
In June, 2007, LSI was granted Gold Level certification by the Texas Commission on Environmental Quality for its participation in the Clean Texas program. To obtain material for the construction of SH 130, LSI negotiated to recycle the asphalt runways at the retired Mueller Airport in Austin, Texas, reducing the amount of virgin material needed for the project by over 250,000 tons and reducing the amount of material sent to a landfill. In addition, LSI installed numerous bat boxes beneath the decks of the new SH 130 bridges to support Mexican free-tailed bat colonies.

References

External links
About LSI from the official SH 130 website

Construction and civil engineering companies of the United States
Companies based in Texas